Stalker is a 2016 Nigerian romantic drama film, directed by Moses Inwang and starring Nse Ikpe Etim, Jim Iyke, Caroline Danjuma and Ayo Makun. It premiered in Nigeria on 26 February 2016. It received 12 nominations and won 3 awards at the 2015 Golden Icons Academy Movie Awards in the United States.

Plot 
Kaylah (Nse Ikpe Etim) is a successful fashion stylist that has many celebrities as clients. On returning home after styling one of her clients, she had a flat tyre in a remote village. Unfortunately for her, she encounters traditionalist looking for a female sacrifice for their gods. Michael (Jim Iyke) saves her from the ritualists. After exchanging pleasantries, Michael continues to stalk Kaylah everywhere to her distaste. Kaylah eventually got a police injunction against Michael that prevents him from being anywhere around her through the help of her police uncle (Ayo Makun). Kaylah discovers her boyfriend, Dickson (Anthony Monjaro) is a married man with kids. She tearfully ended the relationship upon the discovery and was emotionally down. Kaylah's younger sister, (Emem Inwang) gives her the gifts and writeups originally given to her by Michael in an attempt to calm her from the numerous heartbreaks. Upon reading the letter, Kaylah, now obsessed with the idea of getting Michael back, decides to find him and pleads his forgiveness. A flashback reveals that Michael wasn't actually following her but their pathways met coincidentally on numerous occasions. Kaylah makes romantic advances towards Michael who revealed that he was already engaged to Ella (Caroline Danjuma). Unbeknownst to Michael, Kaylah befriends Ella then cunningly visits Michael's home when Ella was supposed to be away in Abuja. Unfortunately for her, Ella barged into the house and a physical duel between both ladies erupted. Ella is killed before Michael returns home.

Cast 
Jim Iyke as Michael
Nse Ikpe Etim as Kaylah
Caroline Danjuma as Ella
Anthony Monjaro as Dickson
Emem Inwang as Cassandra
Niyola as herself
Ayo Makun as Police Officer

Reception 
It has won 3 awards and 12 nominations.

References 

Nigerian romantic drama films
Films about stalking